Apseudidae is a family of crustaceans belonging to the order Tanaidacea.

Genera

Genera:
 Apseudes Leach, 1814
 Apseudopsis Norman, 1899
 Atlantapseudes Bacescu, 1978

References

Tanaidacea
Crustacean families